Royal Indian Engineering College RFC was a nineteenth-century and early twentieth-century Surrey-based rugby union club, who were attached to Royal Indian Engineering College from 1871 to 1903.

Formation

The estate of Coopers Hill in Surrey was bought by the India Office in 1870; and a college was built to train civil engineers to be sent to India. The college was officially opened in 1872.

The rugby club was formed in 1871. In its day, the college's rugby union team, referred to by its opponents as "Cooper's Hill", was one of the most prominent rugby clubs in England.

By the 1890s, the team was deemed of medium strength, and a long way behind the form of its heyday. This was put down to boys leaving school earlier than they had previously, thus the team became composed of men who were physically smaller in stature and physique than their predecessors.

The engineering college closed in 1906.

Notable former players

England internationalists

The following former RIE College players have represented England at full international level.

Scotland internationalists

The following former RIE College players have represented Scotland at full international level.

External links
 Engineering a career in India

References

1871 establishments in England
Rugby clubs established in 1871
English rugby union teams
University and college rugby union clubs in England
Defunct English rugby union teams
1903 disestablishments in England